The 12th Guam Legislature was a meeting of the Guam Legislature. It convened in Hagatna, Guam on January 1, 1973 and ended on January 6, 1975, during the 3rd and 4th years of Carlos Camacho's elected Gubernatorial Term.

In the 1972 Guamanian general election, the Democratic Party of Guam won a fourteen-to-seven (14-7) supermajority of seats in the Guam Legislature.

Party Summary

Membership

References 

Politics of Guam
Political organizations based in Guam
Legislature of Guam